"Don't Say You Love Me" is a song written and performed by American rock musician and singer Billy Squier. Released as the lead single from his sixth album Hear & Now, the song reached No. 4 on the Billboard Mainstream Rock Tracks chart, being his first Top 5 radio hit there since 1984's "Rock Me Tonite". Aside of being a considerable hit on rock radio, its music video succeeded in bringing Squier back to MTV rotation as well as helping Hear & Now reach gold status.

Despite being recorded during the sessions for its parent album, the b-side "Too Much" wasn't included on it. The song is somewhat a rarity; back in the day being only available on the original US cassette single and Australian 7" vinyl. Later on, the song has been re-released on Squier's website as a download-only track. When buying the whole Hear & Now album, the song is automatically included as a bonus track.

References

Billy Squier songs
1989 singles
1989 songs
Songs written by Billy Squier